Tvrtko of Bosnia may refer to:

 Tvrtko I Kotromanić, medieval ruler of Bosnia (1353–1366 and again 1367–1391)
 Tvrtko II Kotromanić, medieval ruler of Bosnia (1404–1409 and again 1421–1443)

See also
Tvrtko (disambiguation)
Tvrtko of Bosnia (disambiguation)
Stephen Kotromanić (disambiguation)
Prijezda Kotromanić (disambiguation)
List of rulers of Bosnia